Tarim may refer to:

Tarim, Hadhramaut, a city in Yemen
Tarim District, Yemen
Tarim River, China
Tarim Basin, China
 Tarim mummies, a series of mummies which have been excavated at Niya, an oasis in the Tarim Basin
Tarim, the monotheistic god worshiped by multiple religions in Dave Sim's Cerebus the Aardvark graphic novel series

See also
 Tarin (disambiguation)